WTKU-FM (98.3 FM) is a radio station in Atlantic City, New Jersey known as "Kool 98-3," playing a classic hits format.

Operating with 6,000 watts, the station can be heard from Beach Haven and Tuckerton in Ocean County south to Lewes, Delaware and as far west as Vineland in Cumberland County.

History
98.3 FM signed on the air on September 27, 1982 as WDVR and featured an AOR/CHR a.k.a. Rock 40 format. In 1987 the station took WKTU as its call letters after New York City's 92.3 FM switched from WKTU to WXRK. on February 13, 1996 call letters were changed to WTKU so that call letters WKTU would be returned to New York City on 103.5 FM.

See also
 WBSS (AM)

External links

Classic hits radio stations in the United States
TKU-FM